"It's Only Rock 'n Roll (But I Like It)" is the lead single from English rock band the Rolling Stones' 1974 album It's Only Rock 'n Roll. Writing is credited to Mick Jagger and Keith Richards and the single reached the top ten in the UK charts and top 20 in the United States.

Inspiration and recording

Recorded in late 1973 and completed in the spring of 1974, "It's Only Rock 'n Roll (But I Like It)" is credited to the Rolling Stones songwriting team Mick Jagger and Keith Richards, although future Rolling Stones guitarist Ronnie Wood collaborated with Jagger on it. The song was originally recorded one night in a studio at Wood's house, "The Wick" in Richmond, London. David Bowie was backing singer to Jagger's lead, and Willie Weeks played bass with Kenney Jones on drums. The song on the album is similar to that original recording, with the Stones keeping the original rhythm track.

The meaning of the lyrics was summed up by Jagger in the liner notes to the 1993 compilation Jump Back; "The idea of the song has to do with our public persona at the time. I was getting a bit tired of people having a go, all that, 'oh, it's not as good as their last one' business. The single sleeve had a picture of me with a pen digging into me as if it were a sword. It was a lighthearted, anti-journalistic sort of thing."

Jagger also has said that as soon as he wrote it, he knew it was going to be a single. He said it was his answer to everyone who took seriously what he or the band did. According to Richards there was opposition to it being a single but they persisted, saying it had to be the next single. He said that to him "that song is a classic. The title alone is a classic and that's the whole thing about it."

Reception
Cash Box called it a "hard rocker with the traditional Stones power that displays a really great hook" with "driving instrumentation and Jagger's inimitable vocal style." Record World called it "an r&r anthem of the most footstompin' fantastic proportions."

Music video

The song was promoted by a music video directed by Michael Lindsay-Hogg, showing the band dressed in sailor suits and playing in a tent which eventually fills with bubbles. This video was one of Mick Taylor's last appearances as a member of the band as he decided to leave in December 1974 (though he did not play on this song). Ronnie Wood, who does not appear in the video, played acoustic guitar on the recording, alongside Keith Richards on electric guitar.

The froth was detergent and, according to Richards, the idea for the sailor suits came about at the last minute because none of the members wanted to get their own wardrobe ruined. Jagger said the entire filming process was "most unpleasant" and was also extremely lengthy. The cameras and lights could not be inside the tent for fear of electrocution. Because of this risk, in order for the video to be filmed at all, the band had to be insured for quite a reasonable sum. Richards is quoted as saying: "Poor old Charlie (Watts) nearly drowned... because we forgot he was sitting down."

Charts

Release
Released in July 1974, "It's Only Rock 'n Roll (But I Like It)" reached number sixteen in the United States and number ten on the UK Singles Chart. The B-side was the ballad "Through the Lonely Nights", which was not featured on any album until the 2005 compilation Rarities 1971-2003.

The Rolling Stones regularly perform the song in concert, although in a different key from the studio recording: on their concert albums Love You Live (1977) and Live Licks (2004), the song is in B, whereas the studio track is in E. According to Richards, the song was recorded in the wrong key, but they did not realise this until they played it live.

Cover versions
"Weird Al" Yankovic also did a polka cover of the song as the first and longest of his "Hot Rocks Polka", which consists entirely of The Stones' songs. It was used in the soundtrack for his movie UHF.
Tina Turner performed the song as a duet with Mick Jagger during the Live Aid concert in 1985. Turner also included the song (as well as "Jumpin' Jack Flash") on her 1982 tour and her 2008–2009 50th Anniversary Tour, where she was joined by Lisa Fischer.
At the Rock and Roll Hall of Fame 25th Anniversary Concert, U2 singer Bono ended the performance of "Vertigo" with the chorus of "It's Only Rock 'n Roll". Later in the same concert U2 and Mick Jagger performed "Gimme Shelter" and "Stuck in a Moment".
The chorus was parodied as "it's only knock and knowall, but I like it" in Genesis' final song on The Lamb Lies Down on Broadway album, "it.", released late 1974. The line was a joke referring to the listeners over-interpreting Peter Gabriel's lyrics, referred to as 'knowalls'.
Brothers Osborne and the War and Treaty teamed up to cover the song for the 2023 Stones tribute album Stoned Cold Country and performed the song live at the 56th Annual Country Music Association Awards.

Artists for Children's Promise version 

In 1999, a cover of "It's Only Rock 'n Roll (But I Like It)" was record by the supergroup  Artists for Children's Promise, featuring an international ensemble of artists. The single was released to raise money for Children's Promise. It was released on 9 December 1999 and peaked at number 19 in United Kingdom.

Artists for Children's Promise 
 Keith Richards
 Spice Girls
 Jon Bon Jovi
 Kid Rock
 Mary J. Blige
 Kelly Jones of Stereophonics
 Kéllé Bryan
 Jay Kay of Jamiroquai
 Ozzy Osbourne
 Womack & Womack
 Lionel Richie
 Bonnie Raitt
 Dolores O’Riordan of The Cranberries
 James Brown
 Mick Jagger
 Robin Williams
 Jackson Browne
 Iggy Pop
 Chrissie Hynde
 Skin of Skunk Anansie
 Annie Lennox
 Mark Owen
 Natalie Imbruglia
 Fun Lovin' Criminals
 Dina Carroll
 Gavin Rossdale of Bush
 B. B. King
 Joe Cocker
 The Corrs
 Steve Cradock & Simon Fowler of Ocean Colour Scene
 Ronan Keating
 Ray Barretto
 Herbie Hancock
 Francis Rossi & Rick Parfitt of Status Quo
 S Club 7
 Eric Idle

Charts

References

1974 singles
The Rolling Stones songs
Songs written by Jagger–Richards
Song recordings produced by Jagger–Richards
Music videos directed by Michael Lindsay-Hogg
1974 songs
EMI Records singles
Songs about rock music